Sean Mullin (born January 13, 1975) is an American film director, screenwriter and film producer.

Early life
Originally from Indiana, Mullin moved to Boca Raton, Florida when he was eight. He graduated from Spanish River Community High School in 1993 before attending The United States Military Academy at West Point, where he was a four-year member of the Army Rugby Football Club.

Upon graduation from West Point in 1997, Mullin served on active duty as an army officer in Germany. He finished his service commitment as a Captain in the New York Army National Guard in Manhattan, where he worked as the Officer in Charge of the soldiers stationed at Ground Zero as a first responder to the attacks of September 11, 2001.

While living in New York City, Mullin performed stand-up comedy regularly and studied improv at New York's Upright Citizens Brigade Theater.

After leaving the military in 2002, Mullin earned an MFA in film directing from Columbia University.

Career
While in graduate school, Mullin wrote and directed three short films -- Sadiq, Man is a Bridge, and The 14th Morning—all of which played at film festivals and won various awards. His MFA thesis film -- Sadiq (starring Laith Nakli, Zach McGowan, and Danny Bruckert) -- was a finalist for the "Student Filmmaker Award" at the 2006 MTV Movie Awards.

In 2012, he produced the feature film Allegiance, written and directed by Michael Connors, and starring Seth Gabel, Pablo Schreiber, Bow Wow, Corey Hawkins, Malik Yoba and Aidan Quinn.

In 2014, his debut feature film as a writer/director -- Amira & Sam—had its world premiere at the Seattle International Film Festival, where it received positive reviews from a variety of sources, including The Hollywood Reporter. Amira & Sam went on to win several major awards at numerous film festivals and was purchased by Drafthouse Films, who released the film theatrically in 2015.  The film stars Martin Starr, Dina Shihabi, Paul Wesley, Laith Nakli, Ross Marquand, and David Rasche.

Amira & Sam was named "One of the 10 Best Romantic Comedies of the Decade" by Slashfilm.

Mullin is the co-writer/co-producer of Semper Fi, which was released theatrically by Lionsgate Films in 2019. Semper Fi was co-written/directed by Academy Award nominee, Henry-Alex Rubin, and produced by Academy Award nominee, David Lancaster. The film stars Jai Courtney, Nat Wolff, Finn Wittrock, Arturo Castro, Beau Knapp, and Leighton Meester.

Mullin is the writer/director of a feature-length documentary about baseball legend, Yogi Berra.  The film was made with the support of the Berra family and it features interviews with Joe Torre, Derek Jeter, Don Mattingly, Mariano Rivera, Joe Girardi, Ron Guidry, Willie Randolph, Bobby Richardson, Tony Kubek, Hector Lopez, Al Downing, Joe Maddon, Bob Costas, Billy Crystal, and Vin Scully. It has made its way to many film festivals, including Tribeca 2022 where it had its world premiere.

References

American film directors
American male screenwriters
1975 births
Living people
Columbia University School of the Arts alumni
United States Military Academy alumni
People from New York (state)